"Where Did You Go" is a song by Australian-Swedish singer Kiana, released as a single on 25 February 2023. It was performed in Melodifestivalen 2023.

Charts

References

2023 songs
2023 singles
Melodifestivalen songs of 2023
Songs written by Joy Deb
Songs written by Linnea Deb